Marco Ramírez may refer to:

 Marco Arturo Ramírez, Mexican footballer
 Marco Méndez (born Marco Anibal Méndez Ramírez), Mexican actor

See also
Marcos Ramírez (disambiguation)